Schulte is an unincorporated community in Sedgwick County, Kansas, United States.  It is located at K-42 (Southwest Boulevard) and MacArthur Rd.

History
Schulte had its start by the building of the Orient Railway through that territory. Schulte had a post office between 1906 and 1934.

Education
The community is served by Goddard USD 265 public school district.

See also
 Lake Afton

References

Further reading

External links
 Sedgwick County maps: Current, Historic, KDOT

Unincorporated communities in Kansas
Unincorporated communities in Sedgwick County, Kansas